The 1982 NCAA Division I Men's Soccer Tournament was the 24th organized men's college soccer tournament by the National Collegiate Athletic Association, to determine the top college soccer team in the United States. The Indiana Hoosiers won their first national title by defeating the Duke Blue Devils in the championship game, 2–1, after eight overtime periods. The final match was played on December 11, 1982, in Fort Lauderdale, Florida, at Lockhart Stadium.

Early rounds

Final

See also
1982 NCAA Women's Soccer Tournament

References 

NCAA Division I Men's Soccer Tournament seasons
NCAA Division I Men's
Soccer in Florida
NCAA Division I Men's Soccer Tournament
NCAA Division I Men's Soccer Tournament